Pop was a pop music program that aired in West Germany from 1974 to 1979. Each year, the show's title was changed to reflect that of the current year, e.g. Pop '76. It was originally broadcast on the SWR and HR networks. Pop was meant to rival fellow ZDF music shows Disco and Star Parade, albeit catering to a younger audience. The show was hosted by Hans Jürgen Kliebenstein from its launch in 1974 until 1978. Afterward, in 1979, Volker Lechtenbrink took over as the show's host.

Several artists, both German and international stars, appeared and performed on the show. Domestic artists from Germany such as the Silver Convention, Arabesque, Boney M., and Donna Summer appeared on the show. International artists such as The Police, Shirley and Co., Middle of the Road, and Jigsaw also made regular appearances.

In 2017, reruns of the show began to air for the first time on One, an ARD network.

Episodes broadcast on ARD

References

Pop music television series
German music television series
1974 German television series debuts
1980 German television series endings
German-language television shows